T. sinensis may refer to:

Tapiscia sinensis, a plant species
Tephrinectes sinensis, a flatfish species
Thliptoceras sinensis, a moth species
Toona sinensis, a tree species
Tor sinensis, a fish species
Turbonilla sinensis, a sea snail species

See also
Sinensis